The Nozzle is a comparatively narrow constriction through which the lower Darwin Glacier flows, causing the ice to bank up somewhat in the vicinity of Diamond Hill. The descriptive name was given by the Darwin Glacier Party of the Commonwealth Trans-Antarctic Expedition (1956–58).

Mountain passes of Antarctica
Landforms of Oates Land